The Fotscherbach is a river of Tyrol, Austria.

It originates in the Stubai Alps on a height of 2200 m (AA) (7,200 ft). It flows in northern direction to the village of Sellrain where it dischanges from the right into the Melach. The water has A/B grade quality.

Rivers of Tyrol (state)
Rivers of Austria